NGC 5999 is an open cluster in the constellation Norma. Its brightest star is HIP 78355. It is 5310 light-years distant and thought to be around 400 million years old.

References

NGC 5999
5999
Norma (constellation)